Hanna Anatoleuna Marusava, née Karasiova (born 8 January 1978) is an athlete from Belarus. She competes in archery.

Karasiova represented Belarus at the 2004 Summer Olympics.  She placed 62nd in the women's individual ranking round with a 72-arrow score of 588.  In the first round of elimination, she faced 3rd-ranked Yun Mi Jin of Korea. Karasiova lost 162-155 in the 18-arrow match, placing 37th overall in women's individual archery.

In 2021, she represented Belarus at the 2020 Summer Olympics in Tokyo, Japan in the team and individual events. Her team (she, Karyna Kazlouskaya, and Karyna Dziominskaya) placed fourth. She also competed at the 2021 World Archery Championships held in Yankton, United States.

References

1978 births
Living people
Belarusian female archers
Olympic archers of Belarus
Archers at the 2000 Summer Olympics
Archers at the 2004 Summer Olympics
Archers at the 2015 European Games
Archers at the 2019 European Games
European Games medalists in archery
European Games silver medalists for Belarus
Archers at the 2020 Summer Olympics
People from Mogilev
Sportspeople from Mogilev Region
20th-century Belarusian women
21st-century Belarusian women